Andrew Jackson Dunning   (August 12, 1871 – June 21, 1952) was a professional baseball player.

Sources
, or Retrosheet

1871 births
1952 deaths
19th-century baseball players
Binghamton Crickets (1880s) players
Bridgeport Giants players
Brockton Shoemakers players
Buffalo Bisons (minor league) players
Fort Wayne (minor league baseball) players
Grand Rapids Shamrocks players
Harrisburg (minor league baseball) players
Helena (minor league baseball) players
Jamestown (minor league baseball) players
London Tecumsehs (baseball) players
Major League Baseball pitchers
Manchester Amskoegs players
Montreal (minor league baseball) players
Norwalk (minor league baseball) players
Oconto (minor league baseball) players
Pittsburgh Alleghenys players
Providence Clamdiggers (baseball) players
Seattle Hustlers players
Baseball players from New York City
Burials at Calvary Cemetery (Queens)